Mohamed Amine Sbihi ( - born 1954, Salé) is a Moroccan politician of the Party of Progress and Socialism. Between 3 January 2012 and 6 April 2017, he held the position of Minister of Culture in Abdelilah Benkirane's government. He was succeeded by Mohamed Laaraj. He was professor of Statistics and Mathematics at the Mohammed V University of Rabat and al-Akhawayn University of Ifrane.

In December 2021, Sbihi was named ambassador to Greece and Cyprus by King Mohammed VI. On 19 January 2022, he presented credentials to the President of the Hellenic Republic Katerina Sakellaropoulou.

See also
Cabinet of Morocco

References

External links
Ministry of Culture

Living people
Government ministers of Morocco
1954 births
Party of Progress and Socialism politicians
People from Salé
Moroccan mathematicians
Moroccan educators
Academic staff of Mohammed V University
Academic staff of Al Akhawayn University

Ambassadors of Morocco to Greece